Philippe Broussard (birth 20 June 1963 in Paris), is a French journalist who is laureate of the Albert Londres Prize (1993). He is the son of police commissioner .

Works 
 Philippe Broussard, Génération supporter, Robert Laffont, 1990, 376 p.
 Philippe Broussard, Les Rebelles de l’Himalaya, Denoël, 1996, 250 p.
 Philippe Broussard and Danielle Laeng, La prisonnière de Lhassa, Stock, 2001, 250 p.
 Marcel Desailly, Capitaine, Stock, 2002, 350 p.
 Robert Broussard and Philippe Broussard, Commissaire Broussard : Mémoires, Stock, 2005
 Philippe Broussard et Jean-Marie Pontaut, Les Grandes affaires de la Cinquième République, L’Express, 18 novembre 2010, 494 p.
 Philippe Broussard, La disparue de San Juan, Stock, 2011, 435 p.
 Philippe Broussard, Vivre cent jours en un, Stock, 2015, 240 p.
 Philippe Broussard, À la recherche de Ginka, 2018, 272 p.

References

21st-century French journalists
1963 births
Albert Londres Prize recipients
Living people
Writers from Paris